George Murnaghan (4 July 1847 – 13 January 1929) was an Irish Nationalist Member of Parliament in the Parliament of the United Kingdom. He represented the Mid Tyrone constituency from the 1895 United Kingdom general election, until the January 1910 United Kingdom general election.

Biography 
Murnaghan emigrated to the US in the late 1860s, where he was a housebuilder and keeper of a livery stable in St Louis, Missouri.  He married Angela Mooney, originally from Dublin with whom he had 9 children.  He and his wife returned to Ireland in the late 1880s for health reasons.

Francis Dominic Murnaghan, the Irish mathematician, was his son, and Francis Dominic Murnaghan, Jr., a United States federal judge, was his grandson.  James Murnaghan, judge of the Supreme Court of Ireland, was his son.  Sheelagh Murnaghan, Ulster Liberal Party MP in Northern Ireland was his granddaughter.

References

External links 

1847 births
1929 deaths
19th-century Irish people
UK MPs 1895–1900
UK MPs 1900–1906
UK MPs 1906–1910
Irish Parliamentary Party MPs
Members of the Parliament of the United Kingdom for County Tyrone constituencies (1801–1922)
Anti-Parnellite MPs